Alfred Rappaport (born 1932) is an American economist, educator and author. He is the Leonard Spacek Professor Emeritus at Kellogg School of Management at Northwestern University and is best known for further developing the idea of shareholder value, popularized by his 1986 book, Creating Shareholder Value. He was chairman of Chicago consulting firm The Alcar Group and resided in La Jolla, California,

The Alcar Group co-founder
In 1979, he co-founded The Alcar Group in Skokie, Illinois with Carl Noble Jr, and served as its chairman. Alcar designed financial modeling products used to analyze the monetary impact of various business strategies, including mergers and acquisitions, divestitures and debt restructuring.

In 1993, Alcar merged with L.E.K. Partnership, which then rebranded to LEK/Alcar Consulting Group LLC. From the mid-1990s, the company pioneered value-based management (VBM), based on Rappaport's academic work. The company merged with software maker Hyperion Solutions in 2003.

Works
Rappaport was a regular contributor to The Wall Street Journal, The New York Times, Fortune, BusinessWeek, and the Harvard Business Review.

He is the originator of "The Wall Street Journal Shareholder Scoreboard", which ranks total shareholder returns of the 1,000 highest value U.S. companies, published annually from 1995 to 2008.

Books
Expectations Investing: Reading Stock Prices for Better Returns; Harvard Business School publishing; with Michael Mauboussin (2001)
Saving Capitalism from Short-Termism: How to Build Long-Term Value and Take Back Our Financial Future (2011)
Ten Ways to Create Shareholder Value; Harvard Business Review, (September 2006)

See also

 Management consulting

References

External links

1932 births
Living people
Northwestern University faculty
20th-century American economists
Place of birth missing (living people)
Corporate finance theorists
Financial models